Kazuyuki Miyata (   Miyata Kazuyuki) is a Japanese mixed martial artist currently competing in the Lightweight division of Rizin. A professional competitor since 2004, Miyata has competed for DREAM, K-1 HERO'S, DEEP, RINGS, and made an appearance at K-1 PREMIUM 2007 Dynamite!!

Background
Originally from the Ibaraki Prefecture of Japan, Miyata began wrestling from a young age and was talented. Miyata won national and regional championships during his middle school years and later high school years at Tsuchiuranichidai High School, where he befriended future professional mixed martial arts fighters, Hayato Sakurai and Michihiro Omigawa. Miyata continued his wrestling career at Nippon University where he was a collegiate champion in the 139 lbs. weight class in 1999.

Olympic career
Miyata competed in Freestyle Wrestling for Japan at the 2000 Summer Olympics in Sydney and was ranked 13th overall. He made it past the 1st round against Otar Tushishvili but lost the second round by decision to Carlos Ortíz. Miyata also finished 17th at the 2001 World Championship 69.0 kg division and 4th at the 2000 Asian Championship 63.0 kg division.

Mixed martial arts career
Miyata made his MMA debut at Rumble on the Rock 6 in 2004, against Royler Gracie where despite dominating the majority of the fight he was caught by submission due to a triangle choke in the second round. Miyata continued his career by fighting in the Japanese promotion, K-1 HERO'S where he held notable wins over Kultar Gill and Ian James Schaffa.

Miyata also fought in the Japanese promotion DEEP but returned to DREAM on October 6, 2009 where he faced Daiki Hata in a reserve bout for the Featherweight Grand Prix. Miyata defeated Hata via unanimous decision. Miyata then defeated Takafumi Otsuka at DREAM 14 by split decision and Takeshi Inoue at DREAM 16 by unanimous decision.
He also walks around 71 kg at 7-8% body fat.

Mixed martial arts record

|-
|Win
| align=center| 16–9
|Erson Yamamoto
|Submission (hammerlock)
|Rizin 14
|
|align=center|2
|align=center|3:23
|Saitama, Japan
|
|-
| Win
| align=center| 15–9
| Andy Souwer
| Submission (armbar)
| Rizin World Grand-Prix 2016: Second Round
| 
| align=center| 1
| align=center| 4:39
| Saitama, Japan
| 
|-
| Win
| align=center| 14–9
| Askar Umbetov
| Submission (arm-triangle choke)
| Real 1
| 
| align=center| 2
| align=center| 1:26
| Tokyo, Japan
| 
|-
| Win
| align=center| 13–9
| Jae Eun Kim
| Submission (guillotine choke)
| DEEP: Haleo Impact
| 
| align=center| 1
| align=center| 2:46
| Tokyo, Japan
| 
|-
| Win
| align=center| 12–9
| Erzan Estanov
| Decision (Unanimous)
| RINGS: Vol. 2: Conquisito
| 
| align=center| 2
| align=center| 5:00
| Tokyo, Japan
| 
|-
| Loss
| align=center| 11–9
| Tatsuya Kawajiri
| Submission (arm-triangle choke)
| Fight For Japan: Genki Desu Ka Omisoka 2011
| 
| align=center| 2
| align=center| 4:54
| Saitama, Japan
| 
|-
| Loss
| align=center| 11–8
| Hiroyuki Takaya
| Decision (split)
| DREAM: Japan GP Final
| 
| align=center| 3
| align=center| 5:00
| Tokyo, Japan
| For DREAM Featherweight Championship
|-
| Win
| align=center| 11–7
| Caol Uno
| Decision (unanimous)
| Dynamite!! 2010
| 
| align=center| 3
| align=center| 5:00
| Saitama, Japan
| 
|-
| Win
| align=center| 10–7
| Takeshi Inoue
| Decision (unanimous)
| DREAM 16
| 
| align=center| 2
| align=center| 5:00
| Nagoya, Japan
| 
|-
| Win
| align=center| 9–7
| Takafumi Otsuka
| Decision (split)
| DREAM 14
| 
| align=center| 3
| align=center| 5:00
| Saitama, Japan
| 
|-
| Win
| align=center| 8–7
| Daiki Hata
| Decision (unanimous)
| DREAM 11
| 
| align=center| 2
| align=center| 5:00
| Yokohama, Japan
| DREAM Featherweight Grand Prix reserve bout
|-
| Win
| align=center| 7–7
| Takeshi Yamazaki
| Decision (unanimous)
| DEEP: 42 Impact
| 
| align=center| 3
| align=center| 5:00
| Tokyo, Japan
| 
|-
| Win
| align=center| 6–7
| Jae Hyun So
| Submission (guillotine choke)
| DEEP: 41 Impact
| 
| align=center| 1
| align=center| 2:31
| Tokyo, Japan
| 
|-
| Loss
| align=center| 5–7
| Luiz Firmino
| Submission (rear-naked choke)
| DREAM 1: Lightweight Grand Prix 2008 First Round
| 
| align=center| 1
| align=center| 7:37
| Tokyo, Japan
| DREAM Lightweight Grand Prix Opening Round
|-
| Loss
| align=center| 5–6
| Joachim Hansen
| Submission (rear-naked choke)
| K-1 PREMIUM 2007 Dynamite!!
| 
| align=center| 2
| align=center| 1:33
| Osaka, Japan
| 
|-
| Win
| align=center| 5–5
| Harvey Harra
| Submission (armbar)
| HERO'S 10
| 
| align=center| 1
| align=center| 1:13
| Yokohama, Kanagawa, Japan
| 
|-
| Loss
| align=center| 4–5
| Vítor Ribeiro
| Submission (arm-triangle choke)
| HERO'S 9
| 
| align=center| 2
| align=center| 1:54
| Yokohama, Kanagawa, Japan
| HERO'S 2007 Middleweight Grand Prix Quarterfinal.
|-
| Win
| align=center| 4–4
| Kultar Gill
| Submission (guillotine choke)
| HERO'S 8
| 
| align=center| 1
| align=center| 5:00
| Nagoya, Japan
| 
|-
| Win
| align=center| 3–4
| Ian James Schaffa
| TKO (cut)
| HERO'S 7
| 
| align=center| 1
| align=center| 0:49
| Yokohama, Kanagawa, Japan
| 
|-
| Loss
| align=center| 2–4
| Norifumi Yamamoto
| KO (flying knee)
| HERO'S 5
| 
| align=center| 1
| align=center| 0:04
| Tokyo, Japan
| 
|-
| Win
| align=center| 2-3
| Erikas Petraitis
| Submission (armbar)
| HERO'S 4
| 
| align=center| 1 
| align=center| 3:59
| Tokyo, Japan
| 
|-
| Loss
| align=center| 1–3
| Genki Sudo
| Submission (armbar)
| HERO'S 3
| 
| align=center| 2 
| align=center| 4:45
| Tokyo, Japan
| HERO'S 2005 Middleweight Grand Prix Quarterfinal.
|-
| Win
| align=center| 1–2
| Shamil Gaydarbekov
| Submission (rear-naked choke)
| HERO'S 2
| 
| align=center| 1 
| align=center| 2:49
| Tokyo, Japan
| 
|-
| Loss
| align=center| 0–2
| Ian James Schaffa
| Decision (split)
| HERO'S 1
| 
| align=center| 3
| align=center| 5:00
| Saitama, Saitama, Japan
| 
|-
| Loss
| align=center| 0–1
| Royler Gracie
| Submission (triangle choke)
| Rumble on the Rock
| 
| align=center| 2 
| align=center| 2:46
| Honolulu, Hawaii, United States
|

References

1976 births
Living people
Japanese male sport wrestlers
Japanese male mixed martial artists
Featherweight mixed martial artists
Lightweight mixed martial artists
Mixed martial artists utilizing freestyle wrestling
Mixed martial artists utilizing kickboxing
Japanese male kickboxers
Lightweight kickboxers
Middleweight kickboxers
Olympic wrestlers of Japan
Wrestlers at the 2000 Summer Olympics
Sportspeople from Ibaraki Prefecture